Tebulosmta (Tebulos mta) is the highest mountain of the Eastern Caucasus and the highest mountain of the Chechen Republic at an elevation of 4,493 meters (14,737 feet) above sea level. The mountain is located on the border of Georgia and Chechnya to the east of Mount Kazbek. The glaciers of the mountain are not large (the total combined area of all of the mountain's glaciers is 3 square kilometers).

Name 
The name Tebulosmta shares a common origin and association with the highland Chechen village of Tebula, which is in proximity to the peak.

See also
 List of highest points of Russian federal subjects
 List of European ultra prominent peaks

References

External links
 "Gora Tebulosmta, Georgia/Russia" on Peakbagger

Mountains of Georgia (country)
Georgia (country)–Russia border
International mountains of Europe
Mountains of Chechnya
Four-thousanders of the Caucasus